XHRN-FM is a radio station on 96.5 FM in Veracruz, Veracruz, Mexico, known as Más Latina.

History
XHRN received its concession on July 20, 1976. It was owned by Romeo Luis Rascón Delgado and broadcast with an ERP of 10 kW.

In October 1993, it was sold to Frecuencia Modulada Tropical and increased its ERP to nearly 40 kW.

In 2015, XHRN was approved for HD Radio.

The owner, Radio Networks, frequently abbreviates its name as RN — it is likely a backronym for the station's calls, which likely come from the original concessionaire's name.

Transmitters

Uniquely among Mexican radio stations, XHRN-FM is broadcast simultaneously from two main transmitters, one in the city of Veracruz and another atop Cerro del Vigía in Santiago Tuxtla.

References

Radio stations in Veracruz
Radio stations established in 1976
Tropical music radio stations